The Ranchi-Hatia riots of 1967 were communal riots which occurred in 1967 in and around Ranchi in present-day Jharkhand, India.
The riots  happened between 22 and 29 August 1967. 184 people were reported killed and 195 shops were looted and set on fire.

References

Ranchi
Riots and civil disorder in India
History of Jharkhand (1947–present)
1967 in India
1967 murders in India
Massacres in India
Crime in Jharkhand
1967 riots
August 1967 events in Asia